Best of New Grass Revival is a 1994 compilation album by progressive bluegrass band New Grass Revival.  The cuts feature the 1981–1989 lineup of the band.  A second compilation was released in 2005 under the title Grass Roots: The Best of the New Grass Revival featuring this lineup as well as earlier band members.

Track listing
 "Love Someone Like Me" (Dunn, Foster) – 2:41
 "Sweet Release" (Flynn) – 4:22
 "In the Middle of the Night" (Flynn) – 4:27
 "Saw You Runnin'" (Moore) – 3:10
 "Revival" (Rowan) – 3:51
 "Hold to a Dream" (O´Brien) – 3:36
 "Can't Stop Now" (Nicholson, Waldman) – 3:58
 "Metric Lips" (Fleck) – 4:35
 "Unconditional Love" (Cook, Nicholson) – 3:22
 "Friday Night in America" (Flynn, Smith) – 3:55
 "You Plant Your Fields" (Lowery, Waldman) – 3:11
 "Let's Make a Baby King" (Winchester) – 3:30
 "Do What You Gotta Do" (Flynn) – 3:30
 "Let Me Be Your Man" (Ritchey) – 3:05
 "Callin' Baton Rouge" (Linde) – 2:39
 "Big Foot" (Fleck) – 7:54
 "Angel Eyes" (Hiatt, Koller) – 4:29
 "I'm Down" (Lennon, McCartney) – 2:10

Personnel

 John Cowan - bass guitar, vocals
 Béla Fleck - banjo, vocals
 Pat Flynn - guitar, vocals
 Sam Bush - fiddle, mandolin, guitar, vocals

New Grass Revival albums
1994 greatest hits albums